Dunkinsville is an unincorporated community in Adams County, in the U.S. state of Ohio.

History
Dunkinsville was laid out in 1841. A post office was established at Dunkinsville in 1847, and remained in operation until 1909.

Notable residents
 John Glasgow Kerr

References

Unincorporated communities in Adams County, Ohio
1841 establishments in Ohio
Populated places established in 1841
Unincorporated communities in Ohio